Ghost whisperer may refer to:

 a spirit medium, someone said to be able to communicate with ghosts
 Ghost Whisperer, a television series
 Ghost Whisperer (video game), an adventure game based on the television series